Rachel Bettmer  (born 5 June 1994) is a Luxembourgian footballer who plays for the Luxembourg national team.

References

External links
 

1994 births
Living people
Luxembourgian women's footballers
Women's association football midfielders
Place of birth missing (living people)
Luxembourg women's international footballers